The Ultra Fast Attack Craft, commonly known as the Colombo class, is a Sri Lankan ultra high-speed class of patrol boats meant for a variety of naval missions from off-shore coastal patrol missions to high-speed, high-maneuver littoral warfare. Built by Colombo Dockyard Limited for the Sri Lanka Navy (SLN), they became the workhorse of the SLN against Sea tiger boats of the LTTE.

Subclasses

Series I
They have a crew of 10. Around 12 were delivered to the Sri Lanka Navy (SLN).

Series II
Series II the successor to the earlier type. Main upgrades include the increase of accommodation for a crew of 12 and major improvements the superstructure. Like the Series I, around 12 were delivered to the SLN.

Series III
The Series III is the recent addition to the class and has incorporated current combat requirements and experience in the battlefield archived by the SLN. Series III was designed by the Colombo Dockyard to the Israeli Shaldag Mk II design. First launch of Series III held on 27 July 1996 and it went beyond the abilities of Shaldag Mk II design by exceeding it from the speed, range and payload.

The propulsion system consists of two MTU 12V 396 TE94 ( each) diesel engines driving two articulated surface drives, which were initially designed for competitive speedboats. Arneson Surface Drive-16 articulating propulsion systems drives provide the vessel with thrust vectoring control similar to the Super Dvora Mk III and Shaldag Mk II.

Their thrust-vectoring propulsion system allows Series III to function in shallow waters at draughts of  facilitating special operations forces delivery on enemy shores and catastrophe relief missions.

Coastal surveillance vessel
The two coastal surveillance vessels built for the Maldivian Coast Guard are very similar to the Series III Ultra Fast Attack Craft.

Armament
Currently all Colombo-class boats have been designed to allow for the installation of Typhoon 25-30 mm stabilized cannon which can be slaved to state-of the art mast-mounted, day and night all weather long range electro-optic systems. In addition to their main armament, they carry additional weapon systems such as 20 mm Oerlikon rear autocannons, automatic grenade launchers, 7.62 mm GPMGs and 12.7 mm HMGs.

Series III gun boats comes with Elop MSIS optronic director and Typhoon GFCS as its own weapons control system. Also these crafts use surface search: Furano FR 8250 or Corden Mk 2; I-band as its radar.

As of 2006, the main armament has been upgraded with the addition of M242 Bushmaster 25 mm (25x137mm) chain-fed autocannons.

Operators

 Maldivian Coast Guard – Coastal surveillance vessels under the National Security Service.
 Sri Lanka Navy – Ultra Fast Attack Crafts

References

External links
Official Site

Gunboat classes
Ships of the Sri Lanka Navy
Post–Cold War military equipment of Sri Lanka
Fast attack craft